Pal's Shanty Tavern refers to a pair of dive bars in Portland, Oregon.

Northeast Portland
The original bar opened in northeast Portland's Hollywood neighborhood in the 1960s. It "had a small-town vibe, with wood-paneled walls, neon beer signs and a cast of friendly regulars", operating in a building which had screened silent films as Elite Theatre from 1914 to 1921. The building was designed by Roberts and Roberts, and was also later known as Rose City Park and the Rose City.

The bar's menu included soft-shell clams, Parmesan garlic bread, and beer. It closed in 2013, due to arson, and was replaced by a Hot Lips Pizza. Two men were arrested for starting the fire, one of whom was an employee. The bar was owned by Cliff and Martha Hanson, and later their children Jim and Sharon. It is included in Laura O. Foster's 2016 book Walking with Ramona: Exploring Beverly Cleary's Portland.

Southwest Portland
A second bar opened in southwest Portland in 1993, with former Belinda's chef Ross Pullen.

See also
 List of dive bars

References

External links

 Pal's Shanty Tavern at Zomato

1960s establishments in Oregon
Dive bars in Portland, Oregon
Hollywood, Portland, Oregon
Southwest Portland, Oregon